Dietrich VIII ( – 7 July 1347) was a German nobleman. He was Count of Cleves from 1310 through 1347.

Dietrich was the son of Dietrich VII, Count of Cleves and his second wife Margaret of Habsburg. He succeeded in 1310 his half-brother Otto, Count of Cleves who had died without sons.

Dietrich VIII married twice:
 Margaret of Guelders († 1333), daughter of Reginald I of Guelders, in 1308.  They had two daughters:
 Margaret († 1341), married in 1332 Adolph II of the Marck († 1347), had issue.
 Elisabeth (1307–1382), married Gerard of Voorne and Otto II of Hesse.
 Maria of Jülich († 1353), daughter of Gerhard V of Jülich, in 1340.  They had another daughter:
 Maria, unmarried, no issue

He was succeeded by his brother John. 
When his brother also died without a son, the County of Cleves went to his daughter's son Adolph III of the Marck and so to the Counts of Marck.

Counts of Cleves
1290s births
1347 deaths